Clement Alexander Finley Flagler (August 17, 1867 – May 7, 1922) was a United States Army Major General who was noteworthy as regimental, brigade and division commander in World War I.

The son of Daniel Webster Flagler and grandson of Clement Alexander Finley, Clement Flagler graduated from Iowa's Griswold College in 1885 and the United States Military Academy in 1889. Commissioned as an Engineer officer, Flagler served on the West Point faculty and then carried out a series of Engineer assignments, with a specialty in rivers and harbors construction. He took part in the Spanish–American War and the Pancho Villa Expedition, and was a graduate of the Army War College.

During World War I, Flagler became a temporary major general and commanded the 7th Engineer Regiment, 5th Infantry Division Artillery, III Corps Artillery, and the 42nd (Rainbow) Infantry Division. He was a recipient of both the French Legion of Honor and Croix de Guerre in recognition of his wartime achievements.

After the war, Flagler reverted to his permanent rank of colonel, and resumed his career as an Engineer officer. He died in Baltimore, Maryland, and was buried at Arlington National Cemetery, in Arlington, Virginia.

Early life
He was born Clement Alexander Finley Flagler in Augusta, Georgia, the son of Brigadier General Daniel Webster Flagler, for whom Fort Flagler, Washington was named.

The younger Flagler was named for his maternal grandfather, Army Surgeon General Clement Alexander Finley. Known as Clement Flagler, Clement A.F. Flagler, and C.A.F Flagler, he grew up in Iowa while his father commanded the Rock Island Arsenal.

In 1885 he received a bachelor of science degree from Griswold College.  He then accepted appointment to the United States Military Academy (USMA) at West Point, New York, after being recommended by Congressman Jerry Murphy. He graduated in 1889, and Flagler's high class ranking (3 of 29) enabled him to obtain a sought after position in the Army's Engineer branch. Among his fellow graduates included several men who would become general officers, such as Charles Dudley Rhodes, William S. Graves, Eben Eveleth Winslow, Frank Daniel Webster, Walter Augustus Bethel, Winthrop S. Wood, Chester Harding, William L. Kenly, Joseph D. Leitch, Edward McGlachlin Jr., George LeRoy Irwin, William Wright Harts, William G. Haan, Charles Crawford and William Lassiter. Charles Young was another distinguished graduate, becoming the first African American to attain the rank of colonel.

While at West Point Flagler was nicknamed "Sioux" as a testament to his dark eyes, hair, and complexion, his having been raised in Iowa, and his self-professed Native American heritage, and his classmates used it with him for the rest of his life.

Start of military career
Assigned as an Engineer officer, Flagler served as instructor in civil and military engineering at West Point, and as engineer officer at Chickamauga, Georgia.

Spanish–American War
During the Spanish–American War Flagler was temporarily promoted to Major and assigned as engineer officer on the staff of the U.S. Army commander in Puerto Rico.

Post–Spanish–American War
Following the Spanish–American War Flagler continued to carry out Engineer assignments, including serving as officer in charge of the federal lighthouse district based in Philadelphia, Pennsylvania and a posting as chief engineering officer for the Army's Department of the East. Flagler also played a role in choosing the route for enlarging the Delaware and Chesapeake Canal.

In 1914 Flagler graduated from the Army War College.

After his War College graduation Flagler served as engineer officer for the District of Columbia Engineer District.

Pancho Villa Expedition
During Mexican border skirmishes of 1914–1916, Flagler served on General Funston's staff in the Vera Cruz Expedition.

World War I
During World War I, Flagler successively commanded the 7th Engineer Regiment, 5th Infantry Division Artillery, III Corps Artillery, and the 42nd (Rainbow) Infantry Division, attaining the temporary rank of major general.

Post World War I
After World War I Flagler served as commandant of the Army's Engineer School at Camp Humphreys, Virginia and then chief engineer of the department based in Honolulu, Hawaii.

In 1921 Flagler was assigned to Baltimore as chief engineer of the Eastern Division, the post in which he was serving when he died.

Military awards
General Flagler was a recipient of the Legion of Honor and the Croix de Guerre for his World War I service.

Death and interment
General Flagler died at Johns Hopkins University Hospital and was buried at Arlington National Cemetery, in Arlington, Virginia.

Family
In 1897, Flagler married Mrs. Caroline DeWitt Quinan (1870–1938) in Salt Lake City.  Caroline DeWitt had children with her first husband, William R. Quinan, from whom she was divorced in 1896, but none with Flagler.

Legacy
Flagler Road, which runs between 18th and 21st Streets at Fort Belvoir, and includes the post headquarters, is named for him.  Fort Belvoir was previously the location of the Army Engineer Center and School, and several streets and buildings there are named for prominent Engineer officers.

References

External links

 
 

1867 births
1922 deaths
United States Army Corps of Engineers personnel
United States Army generals
United States Military Academy alumni
United States Army War College alumni
American military personnel of the Spanish–American War
Recipients of the Croix de Guerre 1914–1918 (France)
Recipients of the Legion of Honour
People from Augusta, Georgia
People from Davenport, Iowa
Military personnel from Georgia (U.S. state)
Burials at Arlington National Cemetery
United States Army generals of World War I
United States Military Academy faculty